Cambrón is a hamlet and alqueria located in the municipality of Caminomorisco, in Cáceres province, Extremadura, Spain. As of 2020, it has a population of 22.

Geography 
Cambrón is located 144km north of Cáceres, Spain.

References

Populated places in the Province of Cáceres